The Ministry of Islamic Affairs is a government agency of the Republic of Maldives, handling the country's religious affairs. It was previously known as Supreme Council for Islamic Affairs, and was constituted by the president of Maldives, Maumoon Abdul Gayoom in 1996. The institution was renamed in November 2008, by the president of the Maldives, Mohamed Nasheed.  The Ministry of Islamic Affairs' mandate is established by Constitution of Maldives.

Responsibilities
Advising the government of Maldives on religious matters.
Governing the religious views of the general population.
Maintaining and publishing Hidhaayathuge Ali'
Duties under Preservation of Religious Unity law 94/6.
Overseeing issues related to Friday prayer.
Inspecting and approving religious texts.
Maintenance of mosques in Maldives.
Setting the Islamic calendar to be followed by Maldivians.
Prohibition of religious preaching except Islamic.
Management of Zakāt and related aspects. Management of funds.
Overseeing Hajj related matters.
Maintaining the Islamic Library in Islamic Centre.
Maintaining the prayer times followed in Maldives
Advising and assisting in various educational institutions in religious matters.
Maintaining the Centre for Qur'anic Studies.
Other religion-related matters.

See also

Freedom of religion in Maldives

References

External links
 Ministry of Islamic Affairs
 Ministry of Islamic Affairs 

Government of the Maldives
Islam in the Maldives